is a volcanic island in the Sea of Japan, 2 km from the coast of the Shimane prefecture in Japan, just off the port Hamada, Shimane Prefecture. Umashima takes its name, meaning "Horse Island" from the fact that it was once used as a grazing ground for horses.

While the island is uninhabited, it is actively used for swimming, fishing, rabbit watching and camping. It is administered as part of the Hamada Kaigan Prefectural Natural Park. The island features Shinto shrine. The scheduled ferry service from Hamada is available.

See also

 Desert island
 List of islands

References

Islands of Shimane Prefecture
Islands of the Sea of Japan
Uninhabited islands of Japan